Vuka is a river in eastern Croatia, a right tributary of the Danube river. The river is located in Vukovar-Srijem County, in the Slavonia region. It empties into the Danube at the town of Vukovar, which got its name from the river.

The ancient name of Pannonian Illyrians for Vuka was Volcos.

Settlements along the river basin
Borovik
Podgorje Bračevačko
Razbojište
Budimci (2 km away)
Krndija (1 km away)
Jurjevac Punitovački
Beketinci
Hrastovac
Vuka
Dopsin (1 km away)
Hrastin
Hudeston (Named after Huđï)
Petrova Slatina (0,5 km away)
Paulin Dvor (0,8 km away)
Ernestinovo (1,5 km away)
Ada
Laslovo
Podrinje
Palača (1 km away)
Markušica
Gaboš
Antin (2 km away)
Mlaka Antinska
Ostrovo (2 km away)
Tordinci
Pačetin (2 km away)
Nuštar (2 km away)
Marinci
Bršadin
Bogdanovci
Vukovar

See also

 Volcae
 Vučedol culture
 Bobota Canal

References

Rivers of Croatia
Slavonia
Geography of Vukovar-Syrmia County